Lu Ping (27 September 1927 – 3 May 2015) was a Chinese politician and diplomat. He served as Head of the Hong Kong and Macau Affairs Office of the State Council of the People's Republic of China. He is best known as China's delegation head and main representative during negotiations for the transfer of sovereignties of Hong Kong and Macau from Britain and Portugal to the PRC and labelled the last governor of Hong Kong Chris Patten as "Sinner of a Thousand Years" for his unilateral electoral reform proposals.

Born in Shanghai, Lu graduated from St. John's University, Shanghai in 1947 and joined the Hong Kong and Macau Affairs Office in 1978.

References

1927 births
2015 deaths
Chinese Communist Party politicians from Shanghai
People's Republic of China politicians from Shanghai
Members of the Preparatory Committee for the Hong Kong Special Administrative Region
Hong Kong Basic Law Drafting Committee members
St. John's University, Shanghai alumni